Nystalea is a genus of moths of the family Notodontidae erected by Achille Guenée in 1852.

Selected Species
Nystalea indiana Grote, 1884
Nystalea collaris Schaus, 1910
Nystalea eutalanta Dyar, 1921
Nystalea ebalea (Stoll, [1780])
Nystalea nyseus (Cramer, 1775)
Nystalea congrua (Dyar, 1908)
Nystalea aequipars Walker, 1858
Nystalea superciliosa Guenée, 1852
Nystalea guttiplena Walker, 1857
Nystalea inchoans Walker, 1857
Nystalea attenuata Walker, 1858
Nystalea seminivea (Walker, 1869)
Nystalea ocellata Walker, 1865

References

Notodontidae